Wonder: The World Tour was the fifth concert tour by Canadian singer-songwriter Shawn Mendes, in support of his fourth studio album Wonder (2020). The concert cycle, presented by Disney+, begin in Portland on June 27, 2022, and was scheduled to end in Dublin on August 1, 2023; visiting the United States and Canada in the summer and fall of 2022, and Europe in spring and summer 2023.

On May 12, 2022, it was announced that Tommy Hilfiger would be donating one million dollars to the tour as part of Mendes' sustainability collaboration with the brand in order to mitigate and offset some of the tour's environmental impact.

On July 27, 2022, after originally postponing three weeks of shows, Mendes announced that he had cancelled the remainder of the tour due to mental health issues.

Background and development 
Mendes began teasing the release of a fourth studio album in the fall/autumn of 2020, with a release date being announced for December 4, 2020. Mendes announced on September 20, 2021, that he would be touring Wonder in 2022 through Europe and North America. Dates were announced on September 23, 2021, with tickets going on sale a week later.

On December 6, 2021, Mendes announced additional dates in Europe, while North American received additional dates to all shows. On January 28, 2022, Mendes announced that all European dates slated for 2022 will be delayed to 2023 due to COVID-19.

On April 4, 2022, Mendes announced additional North American dates. On July 8, only seven shows into the tour, Mendes postponed three weeks of shows due to issues with his mental health. On July 27, he cancelled the remainder of the tour dates due to the same circumstance.

Set list
This set list is representative of the show on June 27, 2022, in Portland. It is not intended to represent all shows throughout the tour.

 "Intro"
 "Wonder"
 "When You're Gone"
 "There's Nothing Holdin' Me Back"
 "Call My Friends"
 "Señorita"
 "Treat You Better"
 "Monster"
 "Mercy"
 "Look Up at the Stars"
 "Teach Me How to Love"
 "Lost in Japan"
 "Why"
 "Stitches"
 "Can't Imagine"
 "Song for No One"
 "Ruin"
 "305"
 "Message in a Bottle" 
 "If I Can't Have You"
 "It'll Be Okay"
Encore
  "In My Blood"

Tour dates

Cancelled shows

References

Shawn Mendes concert tours
2022 concert tours
Concert tours postponed due to the COVID-19 pandemic